Kenneth City is a town in southern Pinellas County, Florida, between St. Petersburg and Pinellas Park, United States.  The population was 4,980 at the 2010 US Census.

History

Kenneth City was founded in 1957 by Sidney Colen, a local developer, who named the city after his son Kenneth Wong. Following the passage of a 2013 charter modification from a strong mayor to a council-manager form of government, the town hired its first manager since becoming incorporated in 1957. Following the March 2014 recruitment of a town manager, the town underwent reorganization intending to bolster its identity and gain recognition among the 23 other municipalities in Pinellas County.

Geography

Demographics

As of the 2000 US Census, there were 4,400 people, 1,952 households, and 1,169 families residing in the town. The racial makeup of the town was 88.05% White, 3.34% African American, 0.18% Native American, 4.84% Asian, 1.91% from other races, and 1.68% from two or more races. Hispanic or Latino of any race were 5.66% of the population.

There were 1,952 households, out of which 22.7% had children under the age of 18 living with them, 42.8% were married couples living together, 13.5% had a female householder with no husband present, and 40.1% were non-families. 34.0% of all households were made up of individuals, and 20.8% had someone living alone who was 65 years of age or older. The average household size was 2.14 and the average family size was 2.72.

In the town, the population was spread out, with 18.6% under the age of 18, 5.5% from 18 to 24, 25.1% from 25 to 44, 22.3% from 45 to 64, and 28.5% who were 65 years of age or older. The median age was 46 years. For every 100 females, there were 78.9 males. For every 100 females age 18 and over, there were 74.4 males.

The median income for a household in the town was $33,962, and the median income for a family was $42,161. Males had a median income of $30,986 versus $26,960 for females. The per capita income for the town was $19,498. About 7.7% of families and 9.4% of the population were below the poverty line, including 16.1% of those under age 18 and 8.0% of those age 65 or over.

References

External links

Towns in Pinellas County, Florida
Towns in Florida